Jacques Lamy is a French pianist, composer and organist.

Life 
Jacques Lamy, son of composer Fernand Lamy is a French pianist and organist. He has been Director of the Henri Duparc Conservatory of Tarbes.

Bibliography 
 Trois silhouettes du grand siècle, pour la mémoire des Couperin, Paris, Philippo & Combre, 1975. 
 Toccatina en ré majeur pour piano, Paris, Phillo, 1971.
 Deux pièces dans un style ancien pour piano, Paris, Philippo et Combre, 1971.

References 

Year of birth missing (living people)
Living people
Place of birth missing (living people)
21st-century French male classical pianists
French classical organists
French male organists
20th-century French composers
21st-century organists
20th-century French male classical pianists
Male classical organists